Catawba Island Township is one of the twelve townships of Ottawa County, Ohio, United States.  The 2000 census found 3,157 people in the township.

Communities
Catawba Island is an affluent unincorporated community located in the northern portion of the township and the northern portion of the Catawba Island peninsula. The Catawba Island ferry terminal is located within the unincorporated community; the Miller Ferry runs from the terminal to the Put-in-Bay ferry terminal and the Middle Bass ferry terminal. The Catawba Island Nature Preserve is also located within the unincorporated community.

Geography
The township is located in the northeastern part of the county on the northern point of the Marblehead Peninsula, presently forming its own peninsula into Lake Erie, but formerly it was an actual island.  It borders the following townships:
Put-in-Bay Township - north, across Lake Erie
Kelleys Island - northeast, across Lake Erie
Danbury Township - southeast
Portage Township - southwest

No municipalities are located in Catawba Island Township.

Name and history
It is the only Catawba Island Township statewide.  The township's website claims that it was named for the variety of grapes that grew plentifully there, however, another source claims that it is named for the Catawba tribe, who live in the Carolinas but descend from the Ohio Valley. Old newspaper articles refer to Rattlesnake Island as once being inhabited by the Catawba tribe. 

Although currently not an actual island, it is presently a peninsula. In prehistoric times, the Portage River is thought to have flowed into Lake Erie at the West Harbor (near East Harbor State Park), and this old channel of the river (which was also denoted on 19th-century maps) formerly made Catawba into a true island. All that currently remains of most of the old riverbed is an insignificant ditch. Prior to about 1804, the British seem to have referred to this island as Cunningham's Island (but, later, that name seems to have been briefly transferred to present-day Kelley's Island, which had formerly  been named Sandusky Island in the 18th-century).

A large section of this township is within the Firelands region (the westernmost area of the Connecticut Western Reserve), and was originally a part of Danbury Township.

Government
The township is governed by a three-member board of trustees, who are elected in November of odd-numbered years to a four-year term beginning on the following January 1. Two are elected in the year after the presidential election and one is elected in the year before it. There is also an elected township fiscal officer, who serves a four-year term beginning on April 1 of the year after the election, which is held in November of the year before the presidential election. Vacancies in the fiscal officership or on the board of trustees are filled by the remaining trustees.

Tourism and recreation 
Catawba Island is a very popular summer destination as part of Ohio's Vacationland region.  The long and protected shoreline provides multiple marinas and cottage communities.  The Lake Erie Islands including the Bass Islands, Kelleys, and Pelee are all easily accessible.  The Miller Ferry which is able to carry cars, trucks, and pedestrians to and from the islands operates off the tip of the peninsula.

See also

 Catawba Island State Park

References

External links

County website
Township website

Townships in Ottawa County, Ohio
Townships in Ohio